Beast is a BBC One sitcom based in a veterinary surgery. Two series of six episodes each were made, with the first broadcast in early 2000 and the second in early 2001. The main premise of the show is that the main character and practice owner does not like being a vet and has a strong dislike of animals.

Cast and characters
Alexander Armstrong as Nick, the lead character, a vet and owner of the practice
Doon Mackichan as Kirsten, the scatty receptionist
Emma Pierson as Jade, a veterinary assistant
Steven Alvey as Andrew, another vet in the practice
Sylvestra Le Touzel as Briony, another vet in the practice

DVD releases
The complete series of Beast was released on 17 March 2014.

External links

2000s British sitcoms
2000 British television series debuts
2001 British television series endings
BBC television sitcoms